Ibrahim Traoré (born 1988) is a Burkinabé military officer who has been the interim leader of Burkina Faso since the 30 September 2022 coup d'état which ousted interim president Paul-Henri Sandaogo Damiba. At age 34, Traoré is the world's youngest currently serving state leader.

Biography 
Ibrahim Traoré was born in Bondokuy, Mouhoun Province, in 1988. After receiving his primary education in Bondokuy, he attended a high school in Bobo-Dioulasso where he became known as being "quiet" and "very talented". From 2006, he studied at the University of Ouagadougou where he was part of the Association of Muslim Students. He graduated from the university with honors. Traoré joined the army of Burkina Faso in 2009, and quickly began to climb the ranks. He was sent to Morocco for anti-aircraft training before being transferred to an infantry unit in Kaya, a town in Burkina Faso's north.

Promoted to lieutenant in 2014, Traoré joined MINUSMA, a United Nations peacekeeping force involved in the Mali War. In 2018, he was cited as one of the MINUSMA soldiers who "showed courage" during major rebel attacks in the Tombouctou Region. He subsequently returned to Burkina Faso where he assisted in operations against the escalating jihadist insurgency. Traoré fought in the "Otapuanu offensive" of 2019 and several other counter-insurgency operations in the country's north. He was promoted to captain in 2020.

Traoré was part of the group of army officers that supported the January 2022 Burkina Faso coup d'état and brought the Patriotic Movement for Safeguard and Restoration military junta to power. From March 2022, he served as the head of an artillery regiment in Kaya. Whether he was ever associated with the "Cobra" special forces, a counterterrorist unit founded in 2019, is disputed. According to several sources such as BBC, Al Jazeera, and Die Tageszeitung, he was part of the unit at some point. However, news magazine Jeune Afrique stated that he was never associated with the "Cobras".

Many supporters of the January coup became dissatisfied with the performance of Paul-Henri Sandaogo Damiba, the junta's leader, regarding his inability to contain the jihadist insurgency. Traoré later claimed that he and other officers had tried to get Damiba to "refocus" on the rebellion, but eventually opted to overthrow him as "his ambitions were diverting away from what we set out to do". The dissatisfaction about the situation was highest among younger officers who fought against the rebels at the frontlines. In addition, there were delays in pay for the "Cobra" troops. When the plotters launched their coup on 30 September, Traoré still held the rank of Captain. The operation was carried out with support of the "Cobra" unit. In the direct aftermath of the coup, Traoré declared himself the new head of the Patriotic Movement for Safeguard and Restoration. On 6 October, he also assumed the position of Interim President as "Head of State, Supreme Head of the Armed Forces". He promises to hold democratic elections in July 2024.

Alleged association with Russia 
Some suspect Traoré of having a connection with Russian mercenary organization Wagner Group. As Traoré entered Ouagadougou, the nation's capital, supporters cheered, some waving Russian flags. The Government of Ghana publicly alleged that Traoré began collaborating with the Wagner Group following the coup, enlisting the mercenaries against the jihadist rebels.

References

1988 births
Living people
Burkinabé Muslims
People from Boucle du Mouhoun Region
Heads of state of Burkina Faso
Burkinabé military personnel
Leaders who took power by coup
Jihadist insurgency in Burkina Faso
University of Ouagadougou alumni
20th-century Burkinabé people
21st-century Burkinabé people
Date of birth missing (living people)